Gisèle Jourda (born 24 March 1955) is a member of the French Senate, representing the department of Aude.

She was elected to the French Senate on 28 September 2014.

Jourda is deputy mayor of Trèbes.

References 

1955 births
Living people
French Senators of the Fifth Republic
Women members of the Senate (France)
21st-century French women politicians
Senators of Aude
People from Marburg
Socialist Party (France) politicians